Mario Zoryez (born 9 September 1950) is a Uruguayan footballer. He played in four matches for the Uruguay national football team from 1973 to 1979. He was also part of Uruguay's squad for the 1975 Copa América tournament.

References

1950 births
Living people
Uruguayan footballers
Uruguay international footballers
Association football defenders
Peñarol players
C.A. Bella Vista players